Lourdes Méndez Monasterio (born Cordova, 11 February 1957) is a Spanish lawyer and politician. She has twice served as a representative in the Congress of Deputies, first between 2004 to 2016 for the People's Party and again for Vox since 2019.

Biography
Méndez was born in Córdoba in 1957, she is the third in a family of thirteen siblings. Her paternal grandfather was José Monasterio Ituarte who served as chief of Spain's army under Francisco Franco. She graduated with a law degree from the Complutense University of Madrid.

Méndez began her career as a member of the People's Party and served on the PP's national executive board before being elected to the Congress of Deputies in 2004. She was noted as being on the socially conservative and Catholic wing of the party, holding positions against abortion, same-sex marriage and euthanasia, which sometimes brought her into conflict with the PP's leadership. She subsequently left the PP after not being included on the party's election list for 2016, and claimed the PP was moving too much into the political centre by abandoning many of its principles. In 2018, she began to speak at public events for the Vox party but did not formally join until 2019. In 2019, she was returned to Congress of Deputies representing the Murcia constituency.

References

1952 births
Living people
Politicians from Madrid
Vox (political party) politicians
Members of the 14th Congress of Deputies (Spain)